Bozon Records is a Polish independent record label specialized in hip-hop music. It was founded in 2013 (officially registered in 2015 by National Court Register) by Piotr "Tau" Kowalczyk (at the time known as Medium) after his departure from Asfalt Records. The company was later signed over to Tau's wife Izabela Detka.

Kowalski founded Bozon Records in the late 2013, unexpectedly announcing on his Facebook profile that he had left Asfalt Record in order to start his own label. In the Facebook note he also said that the first record released by the label would be his project Księga życia by his side-project Egzegeza. The title would be later change to Księga słów and was released in June 2013.

In December 2015, Tau announced that Polish freestyler Edzio had joined the label and that he would release his album in 2016, yet nothing has been released since the declaration.

On December 11, 2017, on his Facebook account, Anatom announced his departure from Bozon Records.

Catalog 
All information taken from Discogs.

References 

Hip hop record labels
Polish independent record labels
Record labels established in 2013